Arílson Gilberto da Costa (born 11 June 1973), simply known as Arílson, is a Brazilian professional football coach and former player who played as a midfielder.

Arílson for Esportivo de Bento Gonçalves, Grêmio, 1. FC Kaiserslautern, Internacional, Palmeiras, Real Valladolid, Universidad de Chile, 15 de Novembro, Portuguesa (SP), América Mineiro, Club Santa Fe, Mogi Mirim and Atlético Tubarão. He also represented the Brazilian national side in seven international games between 1995 and 1996.

Career
Arílson began playing football in the Bento Gonçalves' youth system, and became a professional with Grêmio. He moved to Germany to play for 1. FC Kaiserslautern, but wanted to return to Brazil shortly after his move. Arílson initially tried to re-join Grêmio, but the club would not meet Kaiserslautern's asking price. Instead, he transferred to Grêmio's arch-rivals Internacional.

References

1973 births
Living people
Sportspeople from Rio Grande do Sul
Brazilian footballers
Association football midfielders
Brazil international footballers
1996 CONCACAF Gold Cup players
Grêmio Foot-Ball Porto Alegrense players
Sport Club Internacional players
Sociedade Esportiva Palmeiras players
Clube 15 de Novembro players
Associação Portuguesa de Desportos players
América Futebol Clube (MG) players
Mogi Mirim Esporte Clube players
1. FC Kaiserslautern players
Universidad de Chile footballers
Independiente Santa Fe footballers
Real Valladolid players
Bundesliga players
La Liga players
Chilean Primera División players
Categoría Primera A players
Brazilian expatriate footballers
Brazilian expatriate sportspeople in Germany
Expatriate footballers in Germany
Brazilian expatriate sportspeople in Spain
Expatriate footballers in Spain
Brazilian expatriate sportspeople in Chile
Expatriate footballers in Chile
Brazilian expatriate sportspeople in Colombia
Expatriate footballers in Colombia
Brazilian football managers
Clube Esportivo Aimoré managers